Nistico is a surname. Notable people with the surname include:
Lou Nistico (1953–2020), Canadian ice hockey player
Sal Nistico (1940–1991), American jazz tenor saxophonist